Been So Long is a musical with music and lyrics by Arthur Darvill and book by Ché Walker. The musical is based on Walker's 1998 play of the same name.

Been So Long premiered at the Young Vic on July 11, 2009 and then transferred to Traverse Theatre in Edinburgh on August 7, 2009 as part of the Edinburgh Festival. A live cast recording was also made of the production.

Original Cast
 Yvonne - Naana Agyei-Ampadu
 Gil - Harry Hepple
 Raymond - Arinze Kene
 Simone - Cat Simmons
 Barney - Omar Lye-Fook
 Singers - Samantha-Antoinette Smith, Gemma Knight Jones, Jenessa Qua

Film adaptation

A film adaptation, directed by Tinge Krishnan, was released on Netflix on October 26, 2018. The film stars Michaela Coel as Simone and Arinzé Kene as Raymond.

References

External links
Official London Theatre Guide review

2009 musicals
Musicals based on plays
Soul musicals
Original musicals
British musicals